Events in the year 1851 in Argentina.

Incumbents
 Governor of Buenos Aires Province: Juan Manuel de Rosas (de facto Head of State of Argentina)
 Governor of Cordoba: Manuel López 
 Governor of Santa Fe Province: Pascual Echagüe then Domingo Crespo

Events
 May 1 – governors Justo José de Urquiza of Entre Rios and Benjamin Virasoro of Corrientes rise up against Rosas
 May 29 – Corrientes and Entre Rios enter into alliance with Uruguay and Empire of Brazil
 August 18 – Rosas declares war on Empire of Brazil

Births
 March 19 – Roque Sáenz Peña, President 1910–1914

Deaths

 
1850s in Argentina
Years of the 19th century in Argentina